Kim Sang-ho may refer to:
 Kim Sang-ho (actor) (born 1970), South Korean actor
 Kim Sang-ho (politician) (1901–1982), South Korean politician, see List of members of the South Korean Constituent Assembly, 1948–1950
 Kim Sang-ho (footballer) (born 1964)
 Kim Sang-ho (baseball) (born 1989), South Korean baseball player